The 1913 Geneva Covenanters football team was an American football team that represented Geneva College as an independent during the 1913 college football season. Led by first-year head coach C. Brainerd Metheny, the team compiled a record of 4–4.

Schedule

References

Geneva
Geneva Golden Tornadoes football seasons
Geneva Covenanters football